Trinity Catholic Jr./Sr. High School is a parochial, Roman Catholic junior/senior high school in Hutchinson, Kansas, United States. It is located within the Roman Catholic Diocese of Wichita.  The school has classes from grades 7 through 12.  For sports, it is classified as a 2A school with around 250 students.  The school's principal is Dan Dester.

Extracurricular activities
The school is classified as a 2A school in Kansas according to the Kansas State High School Activities Association. During its history, Trinity Catholic has won nine state championships in various sports.

Athletics
Trinity Catholic Jr./Sr. High School offers the following sports:

 Fall: football, volleyball, boys' cross country, girls' cross country, girls' tennis, cheerleading
 Winter: boys' basketball, girls' basketball, dance team, cheerleading
 Spring: boys' golf, boys' tennis, softball, boys' track and field, girls' track and field

State championships

See also
 List of high schools in Kansas
 List of unified school districts in Kansas

References

External links
 School website

Roman Catholic Diocese of Wichita
Catholic secondary schools in Kansas
Hutchinson, Kansas
Education in Reno County, Kansas
Buildings and structures in Reno County, Kansas
Private middle schools in Kansas
1968 establishments in Kansas
Educational institutions established in 1968